Maaike Koutstaal (born 20 June 1975) is a former professional tennis player from the Netherlands.

Biography
Born in Rotterdam, Koutstaal competed on the ITF junior circuit in the early 1990s and most notably was runner-up in the girls' doubles at the 1993 French Open.

As a professional player she was most successful in the doubles format, with a best ranking of 86 in the world. 

Her best performance on the WTA Tour came at the 1995 Indonesia Open, where she qualified for the singles main draw and was a quarterfinalist in the doubles, partnering Dominique Monami.

In 1995, she competed in the main draw of the women's doubles at all four Grand Slam tournaments, which included a round of 16 appearance at the Wimbledon Championships.

ITF finals

Singles (1–3)

Doubles (9–8)

Junior Grand Slam finals

Doubles (0–1)

References

External links
 
 

1975 births
Living people
Dutch female tennis players
Sportspeople from Rotterdam
20th-century Dutch women
21st-century Dutch women